The Minto Cup is awarded annually to the champion junior men's box lacrosse team of Canada.

It was donated in 1901 by the Governor-General, Lord Minto. Originally restricted to amateurs, within three years the first under-the-table professional teams were already competing for it. After 1904, with efforts to keep the professionals out of competition proving to be futile, it was made open to all challengers.

The last successful amateur challenge came in 1908 when New Westminster Salmonbellies won it; the last amateur challenge was made in 1913 by Vancouver Athletic Club. This would be the only time in Canadian lacrosse history when the Mann Cup champions (Vancouver) faced the Minto Cup champions (New Westminster) head-to-head – with the silverware (Minto) going to the winner.

With the professionals essentially in control of the cup by 1910, the newly inaugurated Mann Cup became the replacement for the senior men's national amateur championship.

The Minto Cup professional competition was dominated by the New Westminster Salmonbellies, who held the trophy for 21 of the 29 years in which it was contested (the competition was suspended during World War I). 1924 was the last year professionals played for the Minto Cup—after the Coast professional league folded in June 1924, it was then placed into storage and for a time lost and forgotten when the last trustee died. The trophy was located just prior to the 1938 junior competition, underneath a desk in his office. During the trophy's period of inactivity, there were suggestions to make the Minto Cup an international championship trophy.

In 1934 the last trustee appointed to supervise the Cup died, and the Lord Minto of the day eventually transferred it to the Canadian Lacrosse Association, which decided to award it as the trophy for the national junior men's champion, starting in 1937. Originally, the competition was between all-star provincial teams formed by adding players to the provincial champion. In 1960 this practice was abandoned and the trophy has since been competed for by the Junior A provincial champions of British Columbia of the British Columbia Junior A Lacrosse League, Ontario of the Ontario Junior A Lacrosse League and recently Alberta, of the RMLL the only provinces where organized lacrosse thrives.

Champions

Senior Amateur Champions (1901–1903)

 1901 Ottawa Capitals - defeated Cornwall
 1901 Montreal Shamrocks - defeated Ottawa Capitals and Vancouver YMCA
 1902 Montreal Shamrocks - defeated New Westminster Salmonbellies
 1903 Montreal Shamrocks - defeated Brantford

Professional/Senior Champions (1904–1908)
 1904 Montreal Shamrocks - defeated Ottawa Capitals
 1905 Montreal Shamrocks - defeated St. Catharines Athletics and Souris (Manitoba)
 1906 Ottawa Capitals - defeated Montreal Shamrocks
 1907 Montreal Shamrocks - won by default, no challenges
 1908 New Westminster Salmonbellies - defeated Montreal Shamrocks and Ottawa Capitals

Professional Champions (1909–1924)
 1909 New Westminster Salmonbellies - defeated Regina Capitals and Toronto Tecumsehs
 1910 New Westminster Salmonbellies - defeated Montreal Lacrosse Club and Montreal Nationals)
 1911 Vancouver Lacrosse Club - defeated New Westminster and Toronto Tecumsehs 
 1912 New Westminster Salmonbellies - defeated Cornwall
 1913 New Westminster Salmonbellies - defeated Vancouver Athletic Club
 1914 New Westminster Salmonbellies - won by default
 1915 New Westminster Salmonbellies - defeated Vancouver Lacrosse Club
 1916 no competition
 1917 no competition
 1918 Vancouver "Greenshirts" - claim disputed by New Westminster
 1919 New Westminster Salmonbellies - defeated Vancouver Terminals
 1920 Vancouver Terminals - defeated New Westminster 
 1921 New Westminster Salmonbellies defeated Vancouver Terminals
 1922 New Westminster Salmonbellies defeated Vancouver Terminals 
 1924 New Westminster Salmonbellies - won by default
 1925–1936 no competition for trophy; placed in storage by Trustee (New Westminster Salmonbellies claims the titles for these years of non-competition)

Junior Champions (1937–Present)

 1937 Orillia Terriers - defeated Vancouver Burrard Bluebirds
 1938 Mimico Mountaineers - defeated Richmond-Point Grey Juniors
 1939 no decision
 1940 Ontario All-Stars - defeated British Columbia All-Stars              
 1941–1946, no competition
 1947 St. Catharines Athletics - defeated Vancouver Burrard BC All-Stars
 1948 Vancouver Burrards - defeated  St. Catharines Athletics           
 1949 Vancouver Norburn Eagletime - defeated Ontario All-Stars  
 1950 St. Catharines Athletics - defeated Vancouver Burrard BC All-Stars
 1951 Mimico Mountaineers - defeated Manitoba All-Stars
 1952 Brampton Excelsiors - defeated Vancouver Kerrisdale BC All-Stars
 1953 New Westminster Salmonacs - defeated Long Branch Monarchs
 1954 Vancouver PNE Junior Indians - defeated Manitoba All-Stars                 
 1955 Long Branch Monarchs - defeated Manitoba All-Stars  
 1956 Mount Pleasant (Vancouver) No.177 Legionnaires - defeated Brampton Excelsiors
 1957 Brampton ABC's - defeated Victoria Shamrocks
 1958 Brampton ABC's - defeated Victoria Shamrocks
 1959 Brampton ABC's - defeated New Westminster Salmonbellies
 1960 New Westminster Salmonbellies - defeated Whitby Red Wings
 1961 Hastings Legionnaires - defeated Burnaby Norburns
 1962 Victoria Shamrocks - defeated Brampton Armstrongs

See also
List of awards presented by the Governor General of Canada
List of awards named after Governors General of Canada

References

External links
Minto Cup

Lacrosse competitions in Canada